King Kobra II (or II) is a 2013 album by the hard rock band King Kobra. It was the second release by the band King Kobra since its reformation by founding member Carmine Appice (of Rod Stewart, Ozzy Osbourne and Blue Murder).

It features most of the original lineup, with the exception of new member Paul Shortino on vocals; Shortino had previously appeared on the band's 2011 self-titled reunion album. Shortino and Appice are joined by original members Johnny Rod, Mick Sweda, and David Henzerling.

Track list

Hell On Wheels
Knock 'Em Dead
Have A Good Time
The Ballad Of Johnny Rod
Take Me Back
When The Hammer Comes Down
Running Wild
The Crunch
Got It Comin'
Deep River
Don't Keep Me Waiting
We Go Round

Personnel
Paul Shortino – lead vocals
David Michael-Philips – guitars, backing vocals, keyboards
Mick Sweda – guitars
Johnny Rod – bass
Carmine Appice – drums, backing vocals, percussion

References

2013 albums
King Kobra albums